Peter Mark Kendall (born May 11, 1986) is an American actor with a career in stage, film and television. He is known for playing the role of Hans in FX's The Americans and Richard Onsted in CBS Strange Angel.

Education
Kendall received a BA in Theatre from McDaniel College, where he also studied jazz guitar. He completed his MFA in Acting from Brown University in 2013.

Career
Kendall's acting career began after he obtained a role in the television series The Leftovers and he played the role of Tom Henney. Thereafter, he played roles in Chicago Med, The Americans and Girls.

He made his first appearance in film playing Connor in Time Out of Mind. Kendall starred on Broadway in Six Degrees of Separation, The Harvest, Blue Ridge, Mercury Fur, and The Rose Tattoo. He has also composed music for film, podcasts, and ads with Hickory Collective.

He is married to actress Helen Cespedes.

Filmography

Television

Films

References

External links
 

American male television actors
Living people
1986 births